Coppelius is a German band from Berlin that plays metal on drums, double bass, cello, and clarinet. The band's name is taken from E.T.A. Hoffmann's short story "Der Sandmann". Their logo consists of a top hat with the word "Coppelius" underneath. 
The band is made up of Max Coppella (clarinet and vocals), Comte Caspar (clarinet, vocals, harpsichord), Graf Lindorf (cello, vocals), Sissy Voss (double bass), Herr Linus von Doppelschlag (drums, joined 2019), and Bastille (Butler, vocals). Former band members include Nobusama (drums, left 2018). Additionally, they are often accompanied by Prof. Mosch Terpin (technician and harpsichord).
On stage the members of the band wear formal, old-fashioned clothes, inspired mainly by the Victorian era. This era is also an inspiration for a lot of the themes in Copellius' music. For this reason, they are often referred to as a Steampunk band.

Discography 
 Albums
 2007: Time-Zeit
 2009: Tumult
 2010: Zinnober
 2013: Extrablatt
 2015: Hertzmaschine
 2019: Kammerarchiv
 2023: Abwärts
 EPs
 2003: Coppelius
 2004: 1803
 2005: To My Creator
 2005: Frühe Werke (box set of all three EPs)
 Videos
 2005: I Get Used To It
 2007: Morgenstimmung
 2009: Habgier
 2010: Die Glocke
 2011: Risiko
 2012: I Told You So
 2013: Spieldose
 2015: Moor
 2017: Black is the Colour
 2019: Zeit & Raum

Gallery

External links 

 Official homepage

Musical groups from Berlin